Kevin Doherty may refer to:

 Kevin Doherty (musician) (born late 1960s), Irish singer-songwriter
 Kevin Doherty (judoka) (born 1958), Canadian judo practitioner 
 Kevin Doherty (footballer) (born 1980), Irish association football coach and former professional player
 Kevin Doherty (filmmaker), Canadian filmmaker, playwright and writer
 Kevin Doherty (politician), Canadian politician
 Kevin Doherty (American football), American football coach
 Kevin Doherty, Scottish musician known as SleepResearch_Facility

See also
 Kevin Izod O'Doherty (1823–1905), Irish Australian politician